Thomas Kavaningilamo Alweendo (born 17 March 1958 in Omusheshe, Oshana Region) is a Namibian politician who has been Minister of Mines and Energy since 2018. In 1997, he became the first Namibian Governor of the Bank of Namibia when he replaced Jafaar bin Ahmad of Malaysia. 

In 2010, Alweendo was appointed to lead the National Planning Commission. When Hage Geingob took office as president in March 2015, he confirmed Alweendo in his position. In a cabinet reshuffle in February 2018, Alweendo became Minister of Mines and Energy, swapping positions with Obeth Kandjoze.

Education

Alweendo earned a bachelor's degree from the University of the Witwatersrand in South Africa and a Master of Business Administration from the University of Wales in the United Kingdom.

As governor of the Bank of Namibia, he maintained the Namibian dollar's linkage with the South African rand. Among some of his achievements during his tenure at the Bank of Namibia are the localization of the payments and banking systems and the establishment of the Financial Intelligence Center. He also raised concerns about increasing amounts of government debt and questioned whether expenditures on education produced better results.

In March 2022, Alweendo signed a Joint Declaration of Intent (JDol) with the minister of Economic Affairs and Climate Action of the Federal Republic of Germany, Robert Habeck, to collaborate on accelerating the development of Namibia's green hydrogen ambitions.

References

1958 births
Living people
Governors of the Bank of Namibia
Alumni of the University of Wales
University of the Witwatersrand alumni
Namibian expatriates in the United Kingdom
Namibian expatriates in South Africa
SWAPO politicians
Mines and energy ministers of Namibia
Members of the National Assembly (Namibia)
Directors-general of the National Planning Commission of Namibia